Joykrishnapur is a  village in the Bishnupur CD block in the Bishnupur subdivision of the Bankura district in the state of West Bengal, India.

A Medieval Survey of History

A beautiful Garuda pillar of 12th‒13th-century was found at Joykrishnapur which is a part of the Bishnupur capital, now preserved in the Bishnupur Museum. Apart from these, Ayudhapurusha and Sankhapurusa have been found, which are associated with symbols of Vishnu.

Geography

Location

Area overview
The map alongside shows the Bishnupur subdivision of Bankura district. Physiographically, this area has fertile low lying alluvial plains. It is a predominantly rural area with 90.06% of the population living in rural areas and only 8.94% living in the urban areas. It was a part of the core area of Mallabhum.

Note: The map alongside presents some of the notable locations in the subdivision. All places marked in the map are linked in the larger full screen map.

Demographics
According to the 2011 Census of India, Joykrishnapur had a total population of 2,749, of which 1,396 (51%) were males and 1,353 (49%) were females. There were 307 persons in the age range of 0–6 years. The total number of literate persons in Joykrishnapur was 1,788 (73.22% of the population over 6 years).

Education
Joykrishnapur High School is a Bengali-medium coeducational institution established in 1963. It has facilities for teaching from class V to class XII. The school has 5 computers and a library with 1,750 books.

Swami Dhananjoy Das Kathiababa Mahavidyalaya was established at Bhara in 2009.

Healthcare
Radhanagar Rural Hospital, with 30 beds at Radhanagar, is the major government medical facility in the Bishnupur CD block.

Notable Person
 Maniklal Sinha

References

Villages in Bankura district